Tigheci is a commune in Leova District, Moldova. It is composed of two villages, Cuporani and Tigheci.

References

Communes of Leova District